The English football club Altrincham F.C. has been playing in lower-tier regional and national leagues since 1911. For fifty years, 1919–1968, Altrincham were in the Cheshire County League, then played successively in the Northern Premier League, Alliance Premier League and Football Conference. From 1997 to 2004 they moved between the Conference and the Northern Premier League, then after one season in Football Conference North won promotion to Conference National. Since 2015 they have been in the National League.

League and finishing position in each season

Source

Seasons
Altrincham F.C.